Jayavarman may refer to:

 King Kaundinya Jayavarman of Funan, d. 514
 Any of the following eight kings of Cambodia:
 Jayavarman I, ruled c. 657–681
 Jayavarman II, ruled c. 770–835
 Jayavarman III, ruled c. 835–877
 Jayavarman IV, ruled c. 928–941
 Jayavarman V, ruled c. 968–1001
 Jayavarman VI, ruled c. 1090–1107
 Jayavarman VII, ruled 1181–1219
 Jayavarman VIII, ruled 1243–1295
 Kings of central India:
 Jayavarman (Chandela dynasty), ruled c. 1110-1120
 Jayavarman I (Paramara dynasty), ruled c. 1142-43
 Jayavarman II (Paramara dynasty), ruled c. 1255-1274